The 2021 Jackson State Tigers football team represented Jackson State University in the 2021 NCAA Division I FCS football season. The Tigers played their home games at Mississippi Veterans Memorial Stadium in Jackson, Mississippi, and competed in the East Division of the Southwestern Athletic Conference (SWAC). They were led by second-year head coach Deion Sanders.

Schedule

Staff

Game summaries

vs. Florida A&M

vs. Tennessee State

at Louisiana–Monroe

Delta State

at Alabama A&M

Alabama State

Bethune–Cookman

at Mississippi Valley State

Texas Southern

at Southern

Alcorn State

References

Mississippi State
Jackson State Tigers football seasons
Southwestern Athletic Conference football champion seasons
Jackson State Tigers football